The Adirondack Railway (originally Adirondack Company) was a railroad that connected Saratoga Springs to North Creek, New York, a distance of . Built by Dr. Thomas Clark Durant, vice-president of the Union Pacific Railroad, it was started in 1864 and completed in 1871. After Durant's death, it was taken over by his son, William West Durant, who sold it to the Delaware and Hudson Canal Company in 1889. The two companies officially merged on November 5, 1902. A stage-coach line was established to take passengers  to Durant properties at Blue Mountain Lake and further by water to Raquette Lake.

The line operated from 2011 to 2018 as a tourist and freight route called the Saratoga and North Creek Railway.

References

 Donaldson, Alfred L., A History of the Adirondacks.  New York: Century, 1921. .
 Gilborn, Craig. Durant: Fortunes and Woodland Camps of a Family in the Adirondacks. Utica, NY: North Country Books, 1981.

External links
The Adirondack Branch of the Delaware & Hudson Railroad

Defunct New York (state) railroads
Predecessors of the Delaware and Hudson Railway
Railway companies established in 1882
Railway companies disestablished in 1902
Passenger rail transportation in New York (state)
1882 establishments in New York (state)
American companies established in 1882